Jacob Dodge Lawson (born March 3, 2001), known professionally as Jvke (stylized in all caps and pronounced "Jake"), is an American singer-songwriter, producer, and social media personality. During the COVID-19 lockdowns, he started creating TikTok videos for his songs, one of which, "Upside Down", went viral in 2021. His debut album, This Is What  Feels Like (Vol. 1–4) (2022), peaked at number 56 on the Billboard 200, while the song "Golden Hour" peaked at number 10 on the Billboard Hot 100.

Lawson was named the MTV Push Artist for October 2022, and he performed "Golden Hour" live on the Tonight Show with Jimmy Fallon, as well as making several performances in Europe for MTV.

Early life
Lawson was born on March 3, 2001  in Providence, Rhode Island. His mother is a public school music teacher and his father is a church pastor. He had a musical upbringing in the church and had piano classes, and also starting singing and writing his own songs for his church. He went to Catholic school and then to public high school in his home city of Cranston, and was enrolled at the Community College of Rhode Island for a year and a half before dropping out to become a singer.

Career
In 2020, during the COVID-19 lockdowns, Lawson and his family joined TikTok. After an early period of creating skits and other videos, he announced his first single, "Upside Down". The song became popular, leading to Charlie Puth approaching Lawson for a remix. On a livestream on Instagram in January 2021, Lawson announced he would be collaborating with Galantis on a song. That song, "Dandelion", was released in January 2021.

Lawson released "Golden Hour" on July 15, 2022, a song which he independently wrote and produced along with editing its music video. It was his first song to chart on the Billboard charts, garnering him worldwide attention and invitations to appear on TV shows. He was also named the MTV Push Artist for October 2022. Following the song's release, MTV UK asked Lawson to perform the song, which they posted onto YouTube. He was also recognized by MTV Italia which he performed for as well.

"Golden Hour" debuted on the Billboard Hot 100 at number 71 and peaked at number 10. It also reached number 19 on the UK Singles Chart. As of November 2022, the song has had more than 100 million views across YouTube, TikTok and other social media platforms.

On November 17, 2022, he announced his first tour, taking in New York, Los Angeles and other nationwide cities.

On December 8, 2022, Lawson released "Hero", a collaboration with Martin Garrix and the mobile card game Marvel Snap.

Discography

Studio albums

Extended plays

Singles

As lead artist

As featured artist

Promotional singles

Notes

References 

Living people
2001 births
American singer-songwriters
AWAL artists
People from Providence County, Rhode Island